Sebastian N. Giuliano (born August 10, 1952)  was the mayor of Middletown, Connecticut from 2005 until 2011. Giuliano, a Republican and Middletown native, defeated Democratic incumbent Domenique Thornton by 807 votes in the 2005 election and was reelected in 2007 to a second two-year term.
He won the election again in 2009, defeating Democratic Councilman Daniel T. Drew and served his last term.

Giuliano was defeated for reelection in 2011 by Democrat Daniel T. Drew, who succeeded him as mayor.
In 2013, Giuliano ran and won a seat on the Middletown, Connecticut Common Council and served as the Minority Leader from 2013 until 2019.
Giuliano decided to run for Mayor again in 2019; however, he was defeated by Democratic Party political newcomer Benjamin Florsheim in his bid to try and win back the Mayor's Office from the Democratic Party. In January 2020, Giuliano announced his Candidacy for an open seat on the South Fire District Commission which we won the majority of the votes in the election that was held on February 3, 2020.

Early life and education 
Sebastian N. Giuliano was born and raised in Middletown, Connecticut the son of Nicholas and Florence (Misenti) Giuliano and his family has ties to Melilli. 
He graduated from Xavier High School (Connecticut) in 1970 and won an Appointment to West Point Academy which he received from then U.S. Senator Abraham Ribicoff and attended the Academy for two year and then transferred to Boston College where he received his bachelor's degree in English with a minor in Mathematics. He then went on to attend Law School at Catholic University of America where Giuliano received his Juris Doctor degree in 1978. He then moved back to Middletown where he opened a private law practice and married his wife, Paula who he met back in college. They have three children together.

Electoral history

References

1950s births
Living people
Connecticut Republicans
Connecticut lawyers
Mayors of Middletown, Connecticut
Connecticut city council members
United States Military Academy alumni
Morrissey College of Arts & Sciences alumni
Catholic University of America alumni